Fujeh Kandi (also Romanized as Fūjeh Kandī) is a village in Charuymaq-e Jonubegharbi Rural District, in the Central District of Charuymaq County, East Azerbaijan Province, Iran. At the 2006 census, its population was 163, in 24 families.

References 

Populated places in Charuymaq County